Richard Collier (1924–1996) was an English journalist, military historian and novelist.

Life
Born in Croydon, Collier joined the RAF in 1942 and was War Associate Editor of Lord Mountbatten's magazine Phoenix: An Allied Magazine for All Allied Forces in South East Asia. After the war, he joined the Daily Mail as a feature writer.

For his 1971 biography of Mussolini, Collier employed three administrative assistants to coordinate the work of 30 research assistants and eight translators. The book's New York Times reviewer found the book uncritical but easy to read and entertaining.

Collier's 1974 The Plague of the Spanish Lady was the first book-length treatment of the Spanish flu pandemic of 1918–19. For the book Collier advertised around the world, asking for memories and eye-witness accounts. The correspondence which he collected is now held by the Imperial War Museum.

Works

Novels
 Beautiful Friend, 1947

Non-fiction
 Ten Thousand Eyes: The Amazing Story of the Spy Network That Cracked Hitler's Atlantic Wall Before D-Day, 1958
 The City that Would Not Die: The Bombing of London, May 10–11, 1941, 1959
 A House Called Memory, 1960
 The Sands of Dunkirk, 1961
 The Great Indian Mutiny: A Dramatic Account of the Sepoy Rebellion, 1963
 The General Next to God: The story of William Booth and the Salvation Army, 1965
 Eagle Day: The Battle of Britain, August 6-September 15, 1940, 1966
 The River that God Forgot: The Story of the Amazon Rubber Boom, 1968
 Duce!: The Rise and Fall of Benito Mussolini, 1971
 The Plague of the Spanish Lady: The Influenza Pandemic of 1918-1919, 1974
 The War in the Desert, 1977
 Bridge Across the Sky: The Berlin Blockade and Airlift, 1948-1949, 1978
 1940, The Avalanche, 1979
 The Road to Pearl Harbor--1941, 1981
 The Freedom Road, 1944-1945, 1983
 The Rainbow People: A Gaudy World of the Very Rich and Those Who Served Them, 1984
 Make-believe: The Magic of International Theatre, 1986
 Their Finest Hour: The Battle of Britain Remembered, 1989
 The Few: Summer 1940, The Battle of Britain, 1989
 The Warcos: The War Correspondents of World War Two, 1989
 D-Day, June 6, 1944: The Normandy Landings, 1992
 The Past is a Foreign Country: Scenes from a Life, 1996

References

1924 births
1996 deaths
English novelists
English journalists
Daily Mail journalists
English military historians